Mario Simón Matías (born 7 January 1981) is a Spanish football manager, currently in charge of Real Murcia.

Manager career
Born in Madrid, Simón began his managerial career at Club San Vicente de Albacete in 1998, taking care of the youth setup. In 2006, he was promoted to the main squad, being promoted with the side in his first campaign.

On 23 July 2009, after a short period at UD Villamalea, Simón was appointed Albacete Balompié B manager. On 24 March 2011 he was appointed at the helm of the main squad, replacing fired David Vidal.

Simón remained in charge of Alba for the remaining 12 matches, suffering relegation and leaving the club in June 2011. He subsequently was named UD Almansa manager in the following month.

Simón left the club in June 2012, returning to his duties in May 2013. On 12 June 2014, after missing out promotion in the play-offs with Almansa, he signed for La Roda CF.

On October 10, 2019, Atlético Albacete announced Simón as a head coach.

Managerial statistics

References

External links

1981 births
Living people
Sportspeople from Madrid
Spanish football managers
Segunda División managers
Segunda División B managers
Segunda Federación managers
Tercera División managers
Albacete Balompié managers
La Roda CF managers
Real Murcia managers